Henry James Carr (August 16, 1849 – May 21, 1929) was an American librarian.

Carr was raised in New Hampshire and Grand Rapids, Michigan. He worked as an accountant and cashier in railway offices from 1867 to 1886. During that time, he studied law at the University of Michigan, gaining admission to the bar in 1879, but he never practiced law. In 1886, Carr was named librarian for the Grand Rapids Public Library, where he worked until 1890 when he was recruited to create a new public library for the residents of Saint Joseph, Missouri. In 1891 he moved to Scranton, Pennsylvania, to assist them in establishing their public library.

Carr served as the president of the American Library Association from 1900 to 1901. He also served as the association's secretary from 1898 to 1900 and its treasurer from 1886 to 1893. Carr served as Librarian in Scranton until his death in 1929.

See also
 Albright Memorial Building

References

External links
 Portrait of Henry James Carr from the American Library Association Archives

 

1849 births

1929 deaths
American librarians
University of Michigan Law School alumni
People from Pembroke, New Hampshire